Marius Arion Nilsen (born 14 August 1984) is a Norwegian politician.

He was elected representative to the Storting from the constituency of Aust-Agder for the period 2021–25, for the Progress Party.

References

1984 births
Living people
Progress Party (Norway) politicians
Aust-Agder politicians
Members of the Storting
21st-century Norwegian politicians